Staphyliniformia is a large infraorder of beetles. It contains over 70,000 described species from all regions of the world. Most species occur in moist habitats - various kinds of rotting plant debris, fungi, dung, carrion, many live in fresh water.

Characteristics
Most Staphyliniforms are small to average sized beetles. The diverse group has few clear apomorphies. They have primitively 11-segmented antennae, a constricted neck well behind the eyes. The pronotum has a well defined, large lateral edge. Larval legs are 5-segmented, the 10th abdominal segment is often with more-or-less fine or strong spines or hooks. Urogomphi (paired "horns" at posterior tip of abdomen of larvae and pupae) with basal articulation.

Systematics and evolution
Staphyliniformia belongs to the suborder Polyphaga and is usually given an infraorder or series rank. It contains three superfamilies:
Histeroidea, including the clown beetles.
Hydrophiloidea, including the water scavenger beetles
Staphylinoidea, including antlike stone beetles, carrion beetles, and rove beetles.
Some recent studies also include the superfamily Scarabaeoidea (infraorder Scarabaeiformia), forming together the so-called Hydrophiloid lineage. A sister group relationship of Hydrophiloidea and Histeroidea is strongly supported.

The unambiguous fossil record dates back to Triassic, and an early Mesozoic origin of the group is probable.

See also
List of subgroups of the order Coleoptera

References

 

 
Insect infraorders
Taxa named by Auguste Lameere